Steve Roach (born February 16, 1955) is an American composer and performer of ambient and electronic music, whose recordings are informed by his impressions of environment, perception, flow and space. His work has been influential in the trance and new-age genres.

Roach has received two Grammy Award nominations for New Age Album of the Year: His 2017 album Spiral Revelation for the 60th Annual Grammy Awards., and 2018's Molecules Of Motion for the 61st Annual Grammy Awards. Roach's work has also been listed on "1,000 Recordings to Hear Before You Die."

Biography

Roach was born as a single child in La Mesa, California, less than 10 miles from San Diego. He developed a passion for Motocross racing in the early 1970s, experiences from which he incorporated into his composing and performing later on. "You have to be fully awake and present ... All of those things relate right over to what would become my path in music. You're completely in; you're inside of it, your life depends on it. That set the tone." Having grown up near deserts, mountains, and the ocean, these became key aesthetic influences in Roach's music. Roach was greatly influenced by electronic music as a teenager, particularly Timewind (1975) by Klaus Schulze and works by Tangerine Dream and Brian Eno. He was also influenced by progressive rock, namely Close to the Edge (1972) by Yes and Ummagumma (1969) by Pink Floyd.

Roach taught himself to play the synthesizer when he was 20; among his first instruments were a Roland SH-3A and Vox Continental. He went on to purchase a Micromoog, ARP 2600, and ARP String Ensemble at once with a "super high interest loan". He lived in Hollywood, California for a brief time, during which he worked at the Licorice Pizza record store alongside future The Simpsons creator Matt Groening, and became a part of the electronic music community in the Los Angeles area. He moved to a bungalow in Culver City, in which he built a recording studio named the Timeroom and worked odd jobs while creating music.

His debut album, Now, was released in 1982. Two years later, he released his best known album, Structures from Silence (1984). He had pressed a run of cassettes of the album, which caught the attention of Stephen Hill who played it on his Hearts of Space radio show on KCRW, which generated further interest in Roach's music. In 1986 he released his acclaimed Quiet Music series. In 1988, he released what has been described by critics as his masterpiece, the double-album Dreamtime Return.

In 1995, Roach signed with Projekt Records, which has since been his primary label.

As Roach's approach to ambient music has matured, his compositions have typically been beatless. His rhythmic and trance-based groove and tribal-ambient releases, however, are nearly as numerous as his more atmospheric releases. Some recordings are strictly synthesizer-based, whereas others include ambient guitar experiments.

Other pieces, however, cross over with more ethnic and folk influences. Roach learned to play the digeridoo during his extended trips to Australia in the 1980s, and he became an early proponent of its use in ambient music. His work with Mexican musician Jorge Reyes introduced Roach to Prehispanic musical elements, which he has also included in his music. These fusions established Roach as one of the founders of the tribal-ambient sound.

Personal life
Roach is married to author and equine teacher Linda Kohanov, who provided vocals on some of his albums. In the early 1990s, Roach moved to the Sonoran Desert near Tucson, Arizona.

Discography

Studio albums

Live albums

Compilations

Collaboration albums

References

External links

1955 births
21st-century American composers
21st-century American male musicians
Ambient musicians
American electronic musicians
American male composers
Living people
Projekt Records artists
Soleilmoon artists
Didgeridoo players